Medal of Honor Heroes 2 is a first-person shooter video game for the Wii and the PlayStation Portable. It is the 12th installment in the long-running Medal of Honor series of World War II games. Each version was built from the ground up for its respective system.  The Wii version was announced at Nintendo's E3 2007 Press Conference on July 11, 2007. Medal of Honor: Heroes 2 is set in World War II, starting on the Normandy beaches trying to control German bunkers and then move on to secure a village in France.

This is the second Medal of Honor game to be released for the Wii. The first was Medal of Honor: Vanguard.

Plot
The player takes the role of Office of Strategic Services operative Lieutenant John Berg. The game has eight missions (seven in the PSP version) and is set against the backdrop of the Battle of Cherbourg.

Lt. Berg is deployed to Northern France in the midst of the Normandy D-Day amphibious invasion to conduct investigations into the German special weapon programs situated in the area. There, he discovers a terrifying weapon that could potentially shift the war in Germany's favor, and endeavors to thwart Hitler's plans to produce that weapon.

Gameplay
The Wii version of the game features up to 32 players in one server, with six maps and six uniforms, three for Axis and three for Allies. The uniforms for the Allies are "Ranger's 2nd", "Ranger's 4th", and "Ranger's 5th", whereas the Axis uniforms are simply "Axis Rookie", "Axis Regular", and "Axis Elite". There are three different online multiplayer modes available. The PSP version is virtually identical in terms of multiplayer functions. The Australian version of the game has no multiplayer mode at all, which has been the subject of much criticism. EA Australia & EB Games Australia also removed all references to the multiplayer aspect from their websites.

EA's official response to the lack of multiplayer for Australia was: "Medal of Honor Heroes 2 for Wii does not support online functionality in Australia. We made an error in the documentation and marketing materials. We are very sorry to have caused confusion for our customers. We will provide a refund to anyone in Australia who wishes to return the game to EA because of the lack of online functionality."

EA Australia has declined to comment on why the online element of the game was omitted from the game, which has led games websites to speculate that the company did not deem it profitable to host the local servers necessary for low-latency game play. There are changes made to weapons in multiplayer mode, such as the STG44 having a much slower firing rate and the Bazooka not requiring to be stationary to fire.

All online servers for Medal of Honor: Heroes 2 for the PlayStation Portable and Nintendo Wii consoles were shut down on August 11, 2011.

Deathmatch
Each player must kill as many players as possible while also attempting to be killed as little as possible. The score is equal to the player's kill to death amount (number of kills - number of deaths = score)

Team Deathmatch
Each player belongs to a team of either Allies or Axis. The team must attempt to kill members of the opposite team. The team's score is determined by the number of enemy players the team kills. Team kills subtract a kill from the player, while suicide kills only take away one point. At the end of the round, the team with the highest score wins.

Infiltration
Also known as capture the flag, this mode involves two teams and the objective is to steal the opposing team's flag as often as possible. At the end of the round, the team with the highest number of successful captures is the winner.

Online leaderboards
The Leaderboards, supported by EA Nation, consist of 10,000 shown rankings. To gain rankings, one must have more kills than deaths.

Arcade mode
The Wii version of the game has an Arcade mode that allows the game to be played single-player as a first-person rail shooter.

Reception

Medal of Honor: Heroes 2 received "average" reviews on both platforms according to video game review aggregator Metacritic.

References

External links
Medal of Honor Heroes 2 official website

2007 video games
Electronic Arts games
First-person shooters
Heroes 2
Multiplayer online games
Nintendo Wi-Fi Connection games
PlayStation Portable games
Video games scored by Michael Giacchino
Video games developed in Canada
Video games set in France
Wii Wi-Fi games
Wii Zapper games
World War II first-person shooters
World War II video games
Video games using Havok